Silver Skies is a 2015 American comedy-drama film written and directed by Rosemary Rodriguez and starring George Hamilton, Jack McGee, Barbara Bain, Jack Betts, Valerie Perrine, Alex Rocco and Mariette Hartley.

Cast
George Hamilton
Valerie Perrine
Barbara Bain
Mariette Hartley
Jack McGee
Alex Rocco
Jack Betts
Howard Hesseman

Release
The film premiered at the Woodstock Film Festival on October 3, 2015.

References

External links
 
 

American comedy-drama films
2015 comedy-drama films
2010s English-language films
2010s American films